Nicolas Troussel is a French professional offshore sailor born on 11 May 1974 in Morlaix (Finistère).

Career Highlights

References

External links
 Official Website

1974 births
Living people
Sportspeople from Finistère
French male sailors (sport)
IMOCA 60 class sailors
French Vendee Globe sailors
2020 Vendee Globe sailors
People from Morlaix